The Dakh Contemporary Arts Center is an independent theater and musical venue in Kyiv, Ukraine, on Velyka Vasylkivska Street near the Lybidska metro station. The theater opened in 1994 and its first director was Vladimir Ohloblin. Since opening, the theater has been home to numerous groups including DakhaBrakha, Dakh Daughters, NovaOpera, and CESHO. Today, the theater is led by Vladislav Troitsky.

General information 
The Dakh Theater is located in the Holosiivskyi district on Lybidska Square near the Lybidska metro station. The theater is located on the ground floor of a multi-storey building.

Performances in Russian and Ukrainian are staged in the theater.

History 
The Contemporary Arts Center "DAKH" was opened on November 12, 1994 by Vladislav Troitsky, who at that time did not link his destiny with the intention to seriously engage in theater and art.

The first director of the DAKH Theater was Volodymyr Ogloblin (1915–2005).

In 2004 the ethno-group DakhaBrakha was founded.

Since 2007, CSM "DAKH" is the main organizer of the international festival of contemporary art GogolFest.

In 2012, the band Dakh Daughters was founded.

In 2016, the social rave of the band CESHO was founded.

Performances 

 "Almost a play almost by Pirandello. Reanimation"

Based on the works of Luigi Pirandello, directed by Vladislav Troitsky

 "Pillow Man"

Based on the play by Martin McDonagh Directed by Vladislav Troitsky (premiere February 22, 2009)

 "Medea Theater"

Based on the play by KLIM Directed by Vladislav Troitsky (premiere February 21, 2009)

 “Invertebrate. Evening for people with impaired posture "

Based on the play by I. Lausund Directed by Vladislav Troitsky (premiere – March 13, 2008)

 "Psychosis 4.48"

Based on the play by Sarah Kane Directed by Vladislav Troitsky (premiere – January 2008)

 "AnnA"

Based on the play by Yu. Klavdiera Directed by Vladislav Troitsky (premiere – December 2007)

 "Love Nativity Scene, or Ukrainian Decameron"

Based on the play by KLIM, directed by Vladislav Troitsky

 "Marriage", based on a play by Nikolai Gogol — directed by Vladislav Troitsky

 Mystical Ukraine Project — "Prologue to" Macbeth "(mysterious action). With the participation of" DakhaBrakha "ethnochaos of the group. Director Vladislav Troitsky.
 Mystical Ukraine Project — the second part of the "Shakespearean" cycle "Richard III. Prologue "with the participation of" DakhaBrakha "- ethnochaos of the group director-director Vladislav Troitsky
 Mystical Ukraine Project — the third part of the "Shakespearean" cycle "King Lear" with the participation of "DakhaBrakha" – ethnochaos of the group director Vladislav Troitsky
 Vladislav Troitsky's project based on KLIM plays "… Seven days with an idiot…" or non-existent chapters of FM Dostoevsky's novel "Idiot":

 day one "sad performance" on the play by KLIM "no It… he… I…" director Vladislav Troitsky
 day two "… Interpreter of the Apocalypse…." — based on the play by KLIM, directed by Vladislav Troitsky
 day three "Fallen Angel" — based on KLIM's play "… I… SHE… THEY… HE… or THE FALLING ANGEL" directed by Vladislav Troitsky
 day four "… Bes-son-Nice…" according to KLIM's play "Bes-son-Nice. and there was evening and there was morning: day four” directed by Vladislav Troitsky
 day eight "… Idiot" based on the play of the same name by KLIM, directed by Vladislav Troitsky

 «DREAMS OF THE LOST ROAD»

Directed by Vladislav Troitsky with DakhaBrakha – ethno-chaos of the band

 «PROTECTION»

Based on the play by Ani Gilling Directed by Varvara

 "NASTY"

Based on a play by Marius von Mayenburg Directed by Vladislav Troitsky

 "Oedipus. DOG HOUSE"

According to the plays: Sophocles "Oedipus Rex" (translated by Ivan Franko) KLIM "Doghouse. Anti-utopia from the life of the silent majority Director – Vladislav Troitsky

 "KLIM SLOW ART SET", based on plays by KLIM
 "Alice's Dream", based on the play by KLIM
 "Paradoxes of Crime", based on the play by KLIM
 "Anna Karenina", based on the play by KLIM

Troupe

1994–2004 

 Vladislav Troitsky
 Tatiana Vasilenko
 Anatoly Cherkov
 Elena Lesnikova
 Alexey Ilyuchenko
 Victor Okhonko
 Natalia Perchishena
 Anna Kuzina
 Alexander Prischepa
 Elena Kushnireva
 Yuliana Lagodenko
 Lyudmila Pletenetska
 Artem Aleksin
 Pavlo Beketov
 Tatiana Nadel
 Oleg Zaitsev
 Alexander Snigurovsky
 Anna Rybak
 Tatiana Tereshchenko
 Pavlo Yurov

2002–2014 

 Tatiana Troitskaya
 Irina Gorban
 Marko Galanevich
 Natalka Bida
 Dmitry Yaroshenko
 Igor Postolov
 Solomiya Melnyk
 Vladimir Minenko
 Ruslana Khazipova
 Cherry
 Zo
 Nina Gorenetska
 Olena Tsibulska
 Iryna Kovalenko
 Victoria Litvinenko
 Roman Yasinovsky
 Daria Bondareva
 Dmitry Kostyuminsky
 Vasily Belous
 Oleksandra Oliynyk
 Anna Nikitina
 Vera Klymkovetska
 Tatiana Gavrilyuk
 Maria Volkova
 Lida Petrova
 Anna Breus
 Anna Khokhlova
 Anastasia Shevchenko
 Sergey Dovgolyuk
 Andriy Dushny
 Mykola Bondarchuk
 Alexey Needed
 Mammoth
 Maxim Demsky
 Natalia Perchishena
 Andriy Palatny
 Anna Okhrimchuk
 Sergey Okhrimchuk
 Eugene Ball
 Semyon Brain

2016 – present 

 Tatiana Troitskaya
 Elena Lesnikova
 Andriy Palatny
 Vera Klymkovetska
 Igor Dimov
 Semyon Kisly
 Vladimir Lutikov
 Vladimir Rudenko
 Alexandra Indik
 Alexander Martinenko
 Marusya Ionova,
 Marichka Shtyrbulova
 Katerina Petrashova
 Nadiya Golubtsova
 Igor Mytalnikov
 Vladislav Gogol
 Sonya Baskakova
 Mykola Stefanik
 Khrystyna Slobodyanyuk

References 

Theatres in Kyiv